The Observation Tower Ahlbeck is a 50 metres tall observation tower with tree observation decks at Ahlbeck on the island Usedom in Germany. The Observation Tower Ahlbeck is a steel framework tower and carries on a fourth platform over the observation platforms and the top some aerials for mobile phone services.

See also 
 List of towers

External links
 

Observation towers in Mecklenburg-Western Pomerania
Buildings and structures in Vorpommern-Greifswald